The 1985 Arab Club Champions Cup took place in Baghdad, Iraq and featured three teams. Al-Rasheed took the championship back to Iraq.

Participants

Qualifying round

Zone 1
Preliminary round tournament held in Jeddah, Saudi Arabia.

1 The match originally finished 1-1, but Al-Rasheed were awarded a 2-0 win as Al-Ahli Sana'a played a Sudanese player who was not registered according to competition rules.

Al-Rasheed advanced to the final tournament.

Zone 2

Nejmeh advanced to the final tournament.

Zone 3

USM El Harrach advanced to the final tournament.

Final tournament

Winner

External links
3rd Arab Club Champions Cup 1985 - rsssf.com

1982
1985 in Asian football
1985
1985–86 in Iraqi football
1985–86 in Algerian football